John Gordon  (1726-1793) was an Anglican priest in the Eighteenth century.
 
He was educated at Peterhouse, Cambridge and ordained in 1752. He was Rector of Henstead, Suffolk from 1758 to 1793; Prebend of Aylesbury 1766 to 1769; Chaplain to the Bishop of Lincoln from 1765 to 1775; Archdeacon of Buckingham from 1766 to 1769; and Archdeacon of Lincoln from 1769 to 1793; and Precentor of Lincoln Cathedral from  1775 to 1793.

He died on 5 January 1793.

References

1726 births
1793 deaths
Alumni of Peterhouse, Cambridge
Archdeacons of Buckingham
Archdeacons of Lincoln